Roxita is a genus of moths of the family Crambidae.

Species
Roxita acutispinata W. Li & H. Li, 2009
Roxita adspersella (Snellen, 1893)
Roxita albipennata Inoue, 1989
Roxita apicella Gaskin, 1984
Roxita bipunctella (Wileman & South, 1917)
Roxita capacunca W. Li & H. Li, 2009
Roxita eurydyce Bleszynski, 1963
Roxita fletcheri Gaskin, 1984
Roxita fujianella Sung & Chen in Chen, Sung & Yuan, 2002
Roxita mululella Gaskin, 1984
Roxita reductella Gaskin, 1984
Roxita spinosa W. Li, 2011
Roxita szetschwanella (Caradja, 1931)
Roxita yunnanella Sung & Chen in Chen, Sung & Yuan, 2002

References
Notes

Sources
 
 Natural History Museum Lepidoptera genus database

Crambinae
Crambidae genera
Taxa named by Stanisław Błeszyński